The 2009 H.I.S. World Table Tennis Championships were held in Yokohama, Japan, from 28 April to 5 May 2009. The Chinese team dominated the competition, following their sweep of the gold medals in table tennis at the 2008 Summer Olympics. It was the tenth (and third consecutive) world table tennis championships at which China won all five available titles.

Fourth-ranked Timo Boll of Germany, a challenger for the men's singles title, was forced to withdraw from the tournament due to a back injury. After Boll's withdrawal, players from China held the top four seedings in both the men's and women's singles competitions.

The event took place during the 2009 swine flu pandemic, with the participants being affected by this. When a case of the strain was found in the body of a seventeen-year-old schoolboy in Yokohama, where the championships were taking place, the event's organisers implemented new measures to stop the flu spreading. Thermographic exam cameras were installed at the player entrances of Yokohama Arena, with the intention of sending anyone with unusually high body temperatures for medical assistance. The players were told to scrub their hands well for hygiene reasons and to avail of face masks and hand gels which had previously been used during outbreaks of severe acute respiratory syndrome and avian influenza. Participants from Mexico, the most severely affected country taking part in the championships, were placed in quarantine and given thermometers to check their temperature regularly.

China collected seventeen of the available twenty medals at the championships, to follow their four golds at the 2008 Summer Olympics in Beijing. After the championships had ended, the country's deputy sports minister, Cai Zhenhua questioned whether China's dominance in the sport would have a negative effect on its development. He said: "From the point of view of the Chinese association, the coaches and the players, it is a great achievement. But personally I am anxious that it is dangerous for the development of this sport worldwide. The truth is we have failed again. Chinese players grabbing all titles in whatever tournament they participate in is definitely detrimental". He advocated issuing invitations to non-Chinese nationals to train in the country and suggested Chinese coaches could be sent to other countries as "up to 70 percent of Chinese knowledge and tactics could be shared with others".

Medal summary

Medal table

Events

Venue 

 Yokohama Arena

Champions 

All five finals featured Chinese players only.

Men's singles 

 Wang Hao

World number one Wang Hao beat Wang Liqin in the men's singles final, China's third consecutive men's singles title and fifteenth world championship title in that section.

Women's singles 

 Zhang Yining

Olympic gold medallist Zhang Yining beat her fellow countrywoman, Liu Shiwen, to win one of the women's singles semi-finals, whilst Guo Yue, the defending champion, beat Li Xiaoxia in the other semi-final. Zhang went on to beat Guo in the final, securing China's eighteenth women's singles title.

Men's doubles 

 Chen Qi /  Wang Hao

In the semi-finals of the men's doubles, Ma Long and Xu Xin beat Jun Mizutani and Seiya Kishikawa of Japan to play Chen Qi and men's singles winner, Hao, in the final match. Chen and Hao won the title.

Women's doubles 

 Guo Yue /  Li Xiaoxia

In the semi-finals of the women's doubles, Guo and Li beat Jiang Huajun and Tie Yana of Hong Kong and Ding Ning and Guo Yan won against South Korea's Kim Kyung-Ah and Park Mi-Young.

Mixed doubles 

 Li Ping /  Cao Zhen

The mixed doubles was won by Li Ping and Cao Zhen.

References

External links 
ITTF website

 
World Table Tennis Championships
International sports competitions hosted by Japan
Table tennis competitions in Japan
Table Tennis
World Championships
April 2009 sports events in Japan
May 2009 sports events in Japan
2000s in Yokohama
Sports competitions in Yokohama